"Now You See It (Shake That Ass)" is the single by Jamaican singer Honorebel, featuring American rapper Pitbull and Jump Smokers. It was released as a digital download on October 5, 2009.

The single is also included on Honorebel's second studio album, "Club Scene" in 2010, under Ultra Records.

Track listing
 Digital download
 Now You See It (Original Version) - 3:30
 Now You See It (Radio Edit) - 3:28
 Now You See It (Clean Mix) - 3:28
 Now You See It (Club Mix) - 4:11
 Now You See It (Afrojack Remix) - 4:44

Credits and personnel
Lead vocals – Honorebel, Pitbull and Jump Smokers
Producers – Jump Smokers
Lyrics – Honorebel, Armando Perez and Tony Arzadon
Label: Ultra Records / OG Music

Source:

Charts

Release history

References

2009 singles
Pitbull (rapper) songs
Songs written by Pitbull (rapper)
Ultra Music singles